Jamuel Tarrant (November 25, 1914 – September 7, 2012) was an American Negro league pitcher in the 1940s.

A native of Piedmont, South Carolina, Tarrant pitched for the Baltimore Elite Giants in 1945. He died in Stockbridge, Georgia in 2012 at age 97.

References

External links
 and Seamheads

1914 births
2012 deaths
Baltimore Elite Giants players
Baseball pitchers
Baseball players from South Carolina
People from Piedmont, South Carolina
20th-century African-American sportspeople
21st-century African-American people